{{Infobox royalty
| name         = Queen Sindeok신덕왕후
| succession   = Queen consort of Joseon
| reign        = 17 July 1392 – 15 September 1396
| reign-type   = Tenure
| predecessor  = Sun-bi No as the last Queen Consort of Goryeo
| successor    = Queen Jeongan
| father       = Kang Yun-seong
| mother       = Internal Princess Consort Jinsan of the Jinju Kang clan
| spouse       = 
| issue        = * Princess Gyeongsun
 Yi Bang-Beon, Grand Prince Muan
 Yi Bang-Seok, Grand Prince Uian
| birth_date   = 12 July 1356
| birth_place  = Kaegyeong, Goksan County, Seohae Province, Kingdom of Goryeo
| death_date   = 
| death_place  = Yi Deukbin-ui residence, Hanseong, Kingdom of Joseon
| place of burial = Jeongreung
| posthumous name = * 순원현경신덕왕후; 順元顯敬神德王后
 신덕고황후; 神德高皇后 (1899)
| house        = Goksan Kang (by birth)
Jeonju Yi (by marriage)
}}
Queen Sindeok (신덕왕후 강씨; 12 July 1356 – 15 September 1396), of the Goksan Kang clan, was a posthumous name bestowed to the second wife and queen consort of Yi Dan, King Taejo; the first monarch of the Korean Joseon Dynasty. She was queen consort of Joseon and was honoured as Queen Hyeon (현비) from 1392 until her death in 1396. She was a political advisor of King Taejo and had a great influence on the founding of Joseon. She was posthumously called as Sindeok, the High Empress (신덕고황후, 神德高皇后).

Biography
 Early life 
Lady Kang was born in Goksan County, Seohae Province (modern-day Goksan County, Hwanghae Province) on 12 July 1356, during the reign of King Chunghye of Goryeo, to Kang Yun-Seong of the Goksan Kang clan and his wife, Lady Kang of the Jinju Kang clan.

Through her father, Lady Kang is a descendant of Kang Ho-gyeong and Kang Chung, who were the maternal ancestors of King Taejo of Goryeo, Wang Geon. She is also a descendant of Kang Bo-jeon, the third son of Kang Chung and uncle of Queen Jeonghwa, who re-established a family in the generation of his eighth great-grandfather, Kang Ji-yeon, Internal Prince Shinseong, during the reign of King Gojong of Goryeo. Kang Ji-yeon was the progenitor of the Sincheon Kang clan (신천 강씨, 信川 康氏). Kang Bo-jeon eventually became the ancestors to Lady Sinjuwon, Kang Jo, Kang Ji-yeon, and Kang Yun-seong.

When Kang Ji-yeon's sixth great-grandson, Kang Seo, Lady Kang's grandfather, was honored as Internal Prince Sangsan, he became the progenitor of the Goksan Kang clan (곡산 강씨, 谷山 康氏).

Lady Kang's uncle, Kang Yun-chung, was Taejo's uncle-in-law and son-in-law of Hwanjo's older brother, Yi Ja-heung, Grand Prince Wanchang (King Dojo’s eldest son). Through this relationship, she was able to come into contact with Yi Seong-gye and soon became his second wife during his time on the battlefield.

 Meeting and marriage 
There is a story on how Yi Seong-gye met his second wife, and it has been said that it’s a famous one.

According to the story, Yi Seong-gye's first meeting with Lady Kang was that one day, while hunting a tiger, Yi Seong-gye got thirsty and found a well, and there was a woman at the well. When Yi Seong-gye asked the woman to pour him some of her water, she poured water into a gourd and then floated a handful of her willow leaves on top of the water. At this, Yi Seong-gye rebuked her, saying, “What kind of evil is this?” The woman replied shyly that she had to rush because he was thirsty, and if Yi drank the cold water, he would get sick.

After hearing this, Yi Seong-gye, who was deeply moved by this, looked carefully at the woman, and her outstanding beauty. For a while, Yi Seong-gye was mesmerized by the woman's wisdom and beauty. The woman at the well was Lady Kang. This story is the same as the story of the meeting between King Taejo of Goryeo and Queen Janghwa. Queen Janghwa and Queen Sindeok are the second wives of the founder of the country, respectively, and are misleading in that they are the daughters of powerful local nobles, or the willow leaf tale handed down from many provinces is related to Yi Seong-gye, or that it may have been.

Lady Kang was eventually arranged to marry Yi Seong-gye prior to or in 1371. At the time of the marriage, Lady Kang was around 21 years younger than Yi. Because Lady Han had died in 1391, Lady Kang raised Lady Han's children as her own despite them being around her age.

In March 1392, in the lunar calendar, when Yi Seong-gye fell and was seriously injured while riding a horse in Haeju, Jeong Mong-ju had tried to assassinate him. Lady Kang had them sent Yi Bang-won, who was living beside the tomb of his birth mother, Lady Han, to Haeju in haste and get Yi Seong-gye safely to Haeju.

Lady Kang was also the one to mitigate the relationship between Yi Seong-gye and his fifth son, Yi Bang-won, from his first marriage. It was said that Lady Kang suppressed the anger of Yi Seong-gye, who severely rebuked Yi Bang-won for killing Jeong Mong-ju by sending an assassin in April of that year. This is a symbol of Lady Kang's resourcefulness and determination, and it can be said that it shows the serenity to do anything for her purpose of establishing a new country.

With the founding of Joseon, Lady Kang eventually became the first Queen Consort of Joseon on August 25 in 1392 (the 7th day of the 8th lunar month) and was given the title of Queen Hyeon (현비, 顯妃; Hyeonbi meaning Illustrious Consort). She was also known by other titles such as Queen Kang (강비, 康妃; Kangbi) and Princess Boryeong (보령택주, 保寧宅主; Boryeong Taekju).

 Involvement in royal politics 
Queen Hyeon tried to pass over the position of Crown Prince from the grown up princes of the deceased Queen Sinui, and pass on the throne onto one of her sons. To make her son successor to the throne, she made a political alliance with Jeong Do-jeon, who met her willingly, and successfully convinced Taejo to have her second son, Yi Bang-seok, Grand Prince Uian, as the next crown prince.

However, it was not the eldest son or the sons and daughters of Queen Sinui. Yi Bang-won, Prince Jeongan could not accept the fact that the second son of his father's second consort would become the crown prince. However, Yi Seong-gye still appointed Queen Hyeon's son, Yi Bang-seok as the next heir. Yi Bang-won, the most politically ambitious, was outraged.

 Death and aftermath 
Queen Hyeon soon died on 15 September 1396 after appointing her second son as crown prince.

Her death affected King Taejo immensely and held a mourning rite. The king built a small hermitage next to her tomb to pray for the Queen's happiness, and had offered incense and tea every morning and evening. As soon as the Heungcheonsa Temple was completed, it became a daily routine for King Taejo to visit the tomb of his wife and temple. After visiting the tomb and temple, the king would spend the evenings with the remaining sons of Queen Sindeok, and would wait to hear the sound of the bell from the temple to put ashes on Queen Sindeok's tomb before going to bed.

Not only that, but during the Sura era, it was only after hearing the sutras pray for Queen Shindeok's happiness that King Taejo finally lifted a spoon and ate, showing sincerity and recovery to his wife.

Prime minister Jeong Do-jeon, planned to kill the sons of Queen Shinui to protect his position in the court and the position of the Crown Prince. Yi Bang-won, having heard about the plan and with the help with his wife, Princess Jeongnyeong, he came to palace where he killed Jeong Do-jeon and Queen Sindeok's two sons. The Prince also killed his younger half-sister's husband, Yi Je, and those who supported the prime minister. Princess Gyeongsun was soon forced by her older half-brother to become a nun.

The anger of the princes and princesses of Queen Sinui fought against Queen Hyeon and her children where it reached a climax. In the end, that anger continued even after the Queen's death, and later became the cause of Taejong's institutionalization of the Seo-eol ban and the Jeok-seo discrimination. This event is known as First Strife of Princes.

The Queen bore Taejo three children; two sons who died in the strife and a daughter who lived to her twenties or thirties.

Family
Parent

 Great-Great-Grandfather
 Kang Deuk-ham (강득함, 康得咸)
 Great-Grandfather
 Kang Suk-jae (강숙재, 康淑才)
 Grandfather
 Kang Seo (강서, 康庶) (1347 - 1424)
 Grandmother
 Lady Hwang of the Jangsu Hwang clan (장수 황씨)
 Uncle - Kang Yun-gwi (강윤귀, 康允貴)
 Father — Kang Yun-seong (강윤성, 康允成) (? - December 1358)
 Uncle - Kang Yun-chung (강윤충, 康允忠)
 Aunt - Lady Yi of the Jeonju Yi clan
 Cousin - Lady Kang of the Goksan Kang clan
 Cousin-in-law - Jo Hui-jik (조희직) of the Changnyeong Jo clan
 First cousin - Jo Geun (조근, 曺謹)
 First cousin - Jo Sim (조심, 曺諶)
 Uncle - Kang Yun-ui (강윤의, 康允誼)
 Uncle - Kang Yun-hwi (강윤휘, 康允暉)
 Cousin - Kang Yeong (강영, 康永)
 Cousin - Kang Woo, Prince Sangjang (상장군 강우, 康祐)
 Uncle - Kang Yun-bo (강윤부, 康允富)
 Mother — Internal Princess Consort Jinsan of the Jinju Kang clan (증 진산부부인 진주 강씨, 晉山府夫人 晉州 姜氏)
 Grandfather - Kang Eun (강은, 姜誾)
 Siblings
 Older brother - Kang Deuk-ryong (강득룡, 康得龍)
 Older brother - Kang Sun-ryong (강순룡, 康舜龍)
 Older brother - Kang Gye-kwon (강계권, 康繼權) (? - 1413)
 Older brother - Kang Yun-kwon (강유권, 康有權)
 Niece - Lady Kang of the Goksan Kang clan
 Nephew-in-law - Lee Sang-hang (이상항, 李尙恒)

Consort
 Husband — Yi Dan, King Taejo of Joseon (27 October 1335 – 18 June 1408) (조선 태조)
 Father-in-law - Yi Ja-chun, King Hwanjo of Joseon (환조대왕) (20 January 1315 - 3 June 1361)
 Mother-in-law - Queen Uihye of the Yeongheung Choi clan (의혜왕후 최씨)

Issue

 Daughter — Princess Gyeongsun (1371 – 8 September 1407) (경순공주)
 Son-in-law - Yi Je (1365 – 1398) (이제, 李濟) 
 Granddaughter - Lady Yi of the Seongju Yi clan (이씨, 李氏)
 Grandson-in-law - Kim Deok-ryang (김덕령, 金德齡) of the Gimhae Kim clan 
 Great-Grandson - Kim Wi-seong (김위성, 金潙聖)
 Adoptive grandson - Yi Yun (이윤, 李潤)
 Son — Yi Bang-Beon, Grand Prince Muan (1381 – 6 October 1398) (이방번 무안대군)
 Daughter-in-law - Grand Princess Consort Samhanguk of the Kaesong Wang clan (삼한국대부인 개성 왕씨).Eldest daughter and third child of Wang Woo, Prince Jeongyang (정양군 왕우, 定陽君 王瑀) (? - 23 March 1397) and Lady No of the Gyoha No clan (교하 노씨, 交河盧氏)Her younger sister, Lady Wang of the Kaeseong Wang clan (개성 왕씨, 開城 王氏), married Queen Soheon’s uncle 
Adoptive grandson - Yi Hyo-sun, Prince Pungan (풍안군 이효손, 豊安君 李孝孫) (1403 - 1463)
 Son — Yi Bang-Seok, Grand Prince Uian (1382 – 6 October 1398) (이방석 의안대군)
 Daughter-in-law - Deposed Crown Princess Hyeon of the Yu clan (폐세자빈 현빈 유씨)
 Daughter-in-law - Crown Princess Hyeon of the Buyu Sim clan (? – 1448) (현빈 심씨, 賢嬪 沈氏)
 Grandson - Yi Won-sun (원손, 元孫) (29 May/14 June 1398 - 26 August/6 October 1398)

In popular culture
Portrayed by Ha Mi-hye in the 1983 KBS TV series Foundation of the Kingdom.
Portrayed by Kim Jeong-yeon in the 1983 MBC TV series The King of Chudong Palace.
Portrayed by Kim Young-ran in the 1996–1998 KBS TV series Tears of the Dragon.
Portrayed by Yoon Joo-hee in the 2012–2013 SBS TV series The Great Seer.
Portrayed by Lee Il-hwa in the 2014 KBS1 TV series Jeong Do-Jeon.
Portrayed by Kim Hee-jung in the 2015–2016 SBS TV series Six Flying Dragons.
Portrayed by Park Ye-jin in the 2019 JTBC TV series My Country.
 Portrayed by Ye Ji-won in the 2021 KBS1 TV series Taejong Yi Bang-won''.

References

External links

1356 births
1396 deaths
Royal consorts of the Joseon dynasty
Korean queens consort
14th-century Korean people
Sincheon Kang clan
14th-century Korean women
People from North Hwanghae